Robert Pershing Wadlow (February 22, 1918  July 15, 1940), also known as the Alton Giant and the Giant of Illinois, was an American man who was the tallest person in recorded history for whom there is irrefutable evidence. He was born and raised in Alton, Illinois, a small city near St. Louis, Missouri.

Wadlow's height was  while his weight reached  at his death at age 22. His great size and his continued growth in adulthood were due to hypertrophy of his pituitary gland, which results in an abnormally high level of human growth hormone (HGH). Even by the time of his death, there was no indication that his growth had ended.

Early life

Wadlow was born in Alton, Illinois, on February 22, 1918, to Harold Franklin and Addie May (Johnson) Wadlow, and was the oldest of five children. He was taller than his father by age 8, and in elementary school a special desk was made for him. He enrolled in Shurtleff College with the intention of studying law.

Adulthood and death

Wadlow required leg braces when walking and had little feeling in his legs and feet. He never used a wheelchair.

Wadlow became a celebrity after his 1936 U.S. tour with the Ringling Brothers Circus, appearing at Madison Square Garden and the Boston Garden in the center ring (never in the sideshow). During his appearances, he dressed in his everyday clothes and refused the circus's request that he wear a top hat and tails.

In 1938, he began a promotional tour with the International Shoe Company, which provided him shoes free of charge, again only in his everyday street clothes. Wadlow saw himself as working in advertising, not exhibiting as a freak. He possessed great physical strength until the last few days of his life.

Wadlow belonged to the Order of DeMolay, the Masonic-sponsored organization for young men, and was later a Freemason. By November 1939, Wadlow was a master mason under the jurisdiction of the Grand Lodge of Illinois A.F. and A.M.

One year before his death, Wadlow passed John Rogan as the tallest person ever.

On July 4, 1940, during a professional appearance at the Manistee National Forest Festival, a faulty brace irritated his ankle, leading to infection. He was treated with a blood transfusion and surgery, but his condition worsened due to an autoimmune disease; he died in his sleep on July 15.

He was buried at Oakwood Cemetery in Upper Alton, Madison County, Illinois.

A life-size statue of Wadlow was erected opposite the Alton Museum of History and Art in 1986.

Height chart

See also
 Acromegaly
 List of tallest people

References

Further reading

External links

 
 
 Footage of Robert Wadlow
 Alton Museum of History and Art article
 Graveyards.com: Upper Alton Cemetery
 

1918 births
1940 deaths
American circus performers
American people of English descent
Infectious disease deaths in Michigan
People from Alton, Illinois
People with gigantism
Burials in Illinois
Shurtleff College alumni
World record holders
Ripley's Believe It or Not!